Ignacio Solares Bernal (1945–) is a prominent Mexican novelist, editor and playwright, whose novel La invasion (The Invasion, 2004) was a bestseller in Mexico and Spain. Until 2005 he served as the Coordinator of Cultural Activities for Literature and Arts at the National Autonomous University of Mexico (UNAM); he is once again a faculty member there and directs the cultural magazine Revista de la Universidad de México. He formerly served as director of the Department of Theater and Dance and the Division of Literature at UNAM. He also edits the cultural supplement to the weekly magazine Siempre. 

Solares is known for mystical occurrences and "dislocations of reality" in his fiction. In Anonimo (Anonymous Note, 1979), a work that has been compared to Kafka's "The Metamorphosis" for its protagonist’s metamorphosis into another person, we see Solares’ rejection of much organized religion (especially the Roman Catholic Church), but his simultaneous search for the transcendent and religious on the borders of human experience. He has written, "I believe in every possible manifestation of spiritual strangeness. I believe in all possible escapes. The only thing I cannot endure is reality, whatever it may be. I believe that the writer is defined by the constant necessity of creating a world, to depart from this world. Literature is more concerned with misery than with happiness. Writing is directly related to frustration. It is a reflection of personal desperation. The writer is profoundly disgusted with his reality."

Life 
Solares was born in Ciudad Juárez, Chihuahua, but much of his fiction is set in Mexico City. Casas de encantamiento (Houses of Enchantment, 1987), which won the Novedades prize in 1988, tries to capture Mexico City through time. He has written a number of historical novels over the years, beginning with Madero, el otro (Madero's Judgment, 1989), and including La invasion. The latter, though it vividly describes the grim reality of the United States' invasion of Mexico and occupation of Mexico City in 1847, during the Mexican–American War, focuses on the protagonist's personal relationships during and many years after the invasion. Columbus (1996), on the other hand, deals with Pancho Villa's invasion of the United States. Nen, la inútil (Nen the Useless, 1994) is concerned with the advent of the Conquistadores into Precolumbian Central America; Nen is an Aztec girl who is raped by a Spanish soldier.

The essays in Cartas a una joven psicóloga (Letters to a Young Psychologist, 2000) and the play La moneda de oro ¿Freud o Jung? (The Golden Coin, Freud or Jung? 2004) reflect Solares' interest in psychotherapy. 

Solares' Delirium tremens (1979, published in English in 2000 as Delirium Tremens: Stories of Suffering and Transcendence) is a work of non-fiction that collects stories of nightmarish visions experienced by alcoholics when undergoing delirium tremens. It is both a penetrating study of addiction, and a harrowing study of descents into personal hells. Solares' father had experienced delirium tremens when Solares was a boy.

Eladio Cortés, in his Dictionary of Mexican Literature, has written that "Solares' novels have the simplicity of a fairy tale and the complexity of a metaphysical treatise. The author's ability to capture and hold the reader's interest is one of his main assets. He is one of contemporary Mexico’s best novelists."

Bibliography 
The following are novels, unless otherwise specified.
 El hombre habitado (The Inhabited Man, short stories). Samo, 1975
 Puerta del cielo (Door of Heaven). Grijalbo, 1976
 Anónimo (Anonymous Note). Compañía General de Ediciones, 1979
 Delirium tremens (non-fiction). Compañía General de Ediciones, 1979; Planeta 1992 y 1999. Translated as Delirium Tremens. Stories of Suffering and Transcendence (2000).
 El árbol del deseo (The Tree of Desire). Compañía General de Ediciones, 1980
 La fórmula de la inmortalidad (The Formula for Immortality). Compañía General de Ediciones, 1983
 El problema es otro (This Is Not the Problem, play). UAEM, 1984
 Serafín. Diana, 1985
 Casas de encantamiento (Houses of Enchantment). Plaza y Valdés/INBA/SEP/DDF/UAM, 1987
 Madero el otro. Joaquín Mortiz, 1989.  Translated as Madero’s Judgment (1999).
 La noche de Ángeles (The Night of Ángeles). Diana, 1991; Planeta, Grandes novelas de la historia mexicana, 2004
 El jefe máximo (The Greatest Chief, play). UNAM, Serie la Carpa, 1991
 El gran elector (novella). Joaquín Mortiz, 1993. Translated as The Great Mexican Electoral Game (1999).
 Nen la inútil (Nen the Useless). Alfaguara, 1994
 Muérete y sabrás (short stories). Joaquín Mortiz, Serie del Volador, 1995
 Columbus. Alfaguara, 1996; Punto de Lectura, 2002
 Teatro histórico (Historical Theater, play). UNAM, 1996
 Cartas a una joven psicóloga (Letters to a Young Psychologist, essays). Alfaguara, Serie Circular, 2000
 El espía del aire (The Spy in the Sky). Alfaguara, 2001
 Imagen de Julio Cortázar (The Image of Julio Cortázar, essays). UNAM / FCE / UdeG, Biblioteca Cortázar, 2002.
 No hay tal lugar (There Is No Such Place). Alfaguara, 2003
 El sitio (The Site). Alfaguara, 1998; Punto de Lectura, 2004
 La moneda de oro ¿Freud o Jung? (The Golden Coin, Freud or Jung? play). Ediciones del Ermitaño, Minimalia, 2004.
 La invasion (The Invasion). Alfaguara, 2004
 La instrucción y otros cuentos (The instruction and other tales). Alfaguara, 2007.
 Cartas a un joven sin Dios (Letters to a young fellow without God). Alfaguara, 2008.
 Ficciones de la Revolución Mexicana (Mexican Revolution's Fictions). Alfaguara, 2009.

Other publications and collaborations
 I.S. de cuerpo entero (I.S. complete). Autobiographic essay. Ediciones Corunda/UNAM, 1990.
 Los mártires y otras historias (Martyrs and other stories). Three short novels. Los mártires, Serafín y El árbol del deseo (Martyrs, Serafin and Tree of Desire). Fondo de Cultura Económica 1997.
 Tríptico de Guerra (War Triptych). Play. Si buscas la paz, prepárate para la guerra. (If peace is what you are looking for, be prepared for war). Textos de Difusión Cultural, Dirección de Literatura, UNAM 2002.
 Luis Cernuda y la suprarrealidad del deseo (Luis Cernuda and the above reality desire'). Essay. Colección Cátedra Luis Cernuda. UNAM/Universidad de Sevilla/Grupo Santander, México, 2006.Textos de Difusión Cultural, Dirección de Literatura, UNAM 2002.
 Ignacio Solares para jóvenes (Ignacio Solares for young). Fragments. Instituto Chihuahuense de la Cultura, Gobierno del Estado de Chihuahua, 2007.
 Voz viva. Ignacio Solares. La invasión y otros textos (Live voice. Ignacio Solares. The invasion and other fragments). Audio. Coordinación de Difusión Cultural, UNAM, 2009.
 Entre voces: Martín Luis Guzmán. Muertes históricas. Con la voz de Ignacio Solares (Between voices: Martin Luis Guzmán. Historic deaths. Voice: Ignacio Solares). Audio. Fondo de Cultura Económica 1998.
 Hagas lo que Hagas. Aldous Huxley. (Whatever you do). Prólogo. Textos de Difusión Cultural, UNAM, 2007.
 Autobiografía. San Ignacio de Loyola. (Autobiography). Introducción. Colección Licenciado Vidriera, Textos de Difusión Cultural, UNAM, 2007.
 Una fábula. Christopher Isherwood. (A fable). Introducción. Textos de Difusión Cultural, UNAM, 2009.

 Books Translated into English 
 Yankee Invasion: A Novel of Mexico City. Translated by Timothy G. Compton. Scarletta Press 2009. 
 Lost in the City: Tree of Desire & Serafin. Two novels by Ignacio Solares. Translated by Carolyn & John Brushwood. University of Texas Press, 1998. The Great Mexican Electoral Game. Translated by Alfonso González. York Press Ltd. 1999. Madero’s Judgment. Translated by Alfonso González and Juana Wong. York Press Ltd. 1999. Delirium Tremens. Stories of Suffering and Transcendence. Translated by Timothy G. Compton. Hazelden 2000. There Is No Such Place. Translated by Timothy G. Compton. Authorhouse 2008. The golden coin : Freud or Jung?'' Translated by Timothy G. Compton. Ediciones del Ermitaño, 2004.

References

External links 
 Ignacio Solares' official website.
 "La materia de los sueños," a short biography of Solares.

1945 births
Living people
Mexican novelists
Mexican male writers
Male novelists